Lee Tahney (Korean: 이탄희, born 3 November 1978) is a South Korean lawyer, judge and politician. A member of the liberal Democratic Party, he was elected the Member of the National Assembly for Yongin 4th constituency in 2020 election. Prior to entering politics, he was the judge in various local and high courts.

Early life and education 
Lee was born in Seoul in 1978. He attended  and obtained a bachelor's degree in law at Seoul National University. He earned Master of Laws degree at Harvard University in the United States.

Legal career 
After qualifying for the bar in 2002, Lee graduated from the Judicial Research and Training Institute in 2005. He returned to Suwon District Court in 2016. He was briefly a barrister at the Korean Public Interest Lawyers Group from 2019 to 2020, till he joined the politics.

Shortly after this, he had found out some documents, such as the Judiciary Blacklist and the Dissolution Plan of the Institute of International Human Rights Law; both are related to the former Chief Justice of the Supreme Court Yang Sung-tae. He then submitted a resignation letter in order to protest against the judicial scandal, although the letter was rejected. However, this incident has contributed for the judicial reform, including the detention of the ex-Chief Justice.

Political career 
On 19 January 2020, Lee was brought to the ruling Democratic Party. A month later, he was nominated for Yongin 4th constituency, where the incumbent was Pyo Chang-won of the same party. In the election on 15 April, he received 53.46% and defeated the United Future candidate Kim Bum-soo.

Election results

General elections

References

External links 
 Lee Tahney on Facebook

1978 births
Living people
21st-century South Korean judges
Minjoo Party of Korea politicians
Seoul National University alumni
People from Seoul
Harvard Law School alumni